Donskoy is a rural locality (a khutor) in Panshinskoye Rural Settlement, Gorodishchensky District, Volgograd Oblast, Russia. The population was 137 as of 2010. There are 10 streets.

Geography 
Donskoy is located in steppe, 3 km from the left bank of the Don River, 63 km northwest of Gorodishche (the district's administrative centre) by road. Nizhnegerasimovsky is the nearest rural locality.

References 

Rural localities in Gorodishchensky District, Volgograd Oblast